Valynce Te Whare (born 15 September 2000) is a New Zealand rugby league player who plays centre for the Dolphins in the NRL. He previously played for the Redcliffe Dolphins in the Queensland Rugby League competition.

Career 
Te Whare was born and raised in Waikato, New Zealand. He grew up in NZ, and played rugby union for his junior club, Fraser Tech. In 2019, Valynce was selected for the Waikato Rugby Union team. From 2019 to 2020, Te Whare played wing for Waikato, scoring four tries in eight games.

Te Whare is of NZ Māori descent.

In 2021, Te Whare played two games for King Country Rugby Football Union, scoring two tries.

In January 2022, Te Whare signed for the Redcliffe Dolphins. On 4 June 2022, he made his debut playing at centre, scoring a double, and contributing to their 54–0 victory over the Ipswich Jets.

As of round 16 in the 2022 season of the QRL Cup, Te Whare has scored 8 tries in 7 games, winning 5 games and drawing 2.[]

Earlier, in December 2021, Te Whare signed a contract with new NRL side the Dolphins, who played their first match in the league in 2023.

References 

2000 births
Living people
King Country rugby union players
New Zealand rugby league players
New Zealand rugby union players
Redcliffe Dolphins players
Rugby league centres
Rugby league players from Waikato
Rugby union centres
Rugby union players from Waikato
Waikato rugby union players